Mankato West High School is a public secondary school located in Mankato, in the U.S. State of Minnesota. According to the school district in 2016, Mankato West enrolls about 1150 students in four grades, grades 9–12. In 1992–93 the school was designated as a "Blue Ribbon School of Excellence" by the United States Department of Education.

The schools teams are nicknamed the Scarlets. Mankato West is a member of the Big 9 Conference.

Facilities
The school has a 1,100-seat auditorium, a fitness center, and six computer labs. In 2013, Mankato passed a $69.0 million bond issue, including $2 million to expand the school's cafeteria.

Athletics 
Mankato West High School has the following sports offerings:

 Boys and Girls Adapted Bowling
 Boys and Girls Tennis
 Boys and Girls Track and Field
 Boys Baseball
 Football
 Girls Softball
 Boys and Girls Swim and Dive
 Boys Wrestling
 Boys and Girls Alpine Skiing
 Boys and Girls Hockey
 Boys and Girls Basketball
 Boys and Girls Golf
 Boys and Girls Cross Country
 Boys and Girls Lacrosse

Extracurricular 
Mankato West High School has the following extracurricular offerings:

 Knowledge Bowl
 Theater
 VEX Robotics
 Math League
 Debate
 Speech

Notable alumni
 Former CEO of General Motors Daniel Akerson graduated from Mankato West High School in 1966.
 The Governor of Minnesota, Tim Walz, once taught geography and coached football at Mankato West.
 Gary Mielke, professional baseball player, Texas Rangers, pitcher.
 Margaret Anderson Kelliher former speaker of the house, 2010 gubernatorial candidate, former Commissioner of the Minnesota Department of Transportation, and current Director of the Minneapolis Department of Public Works

References

External links
 Mankato West High School homepage

Public high schools in Minnesota
Schools in Blue Earth County, Minnesota